Melton is a local government district with borough status in north-eastern Leicestershire, England. It is named after its main town, Melton Mowbray. Other settlements include Asfordby and Bottesford. At the 2011 census, it had a population of 50,376.

Melton is a rural area in the north-east part of Leicestershire and at the heart of the East Midlands. It is the 10th smallest district in England by population. The main activities of the district are centred on the single market town of Melton Mowbray which had a population of 27,158 at the 2011 census.

There are some 70 small villages within the surrounding rural area and the area of the district is 481.38 km2.

History
It was formed in 1974, from the Melton Mowbray Urban District and the Melton and Belvoir Rural District. The council offices on Nottingham Road burnt down on 30 May 2008. Across the road were situated the main offices of the East Midlands Regional Assembly before it was abolished in 2010.

Food
The borough is the home of Stilton Cheese and Melton Mowbray Pork Pies.

Parishes
 Ab Kettleby, Asfordby
 Barkestone-le-Vale, Plungar and Redmile, Belvoir, Bottesford, Buckminster
 Broughton and Old Dalby, Branston, Burton and Dalby
 Clawson, Hose and Harby, Croxton Kerrial 
 Eaton, Eastwell
 Freeby, Frisby on the Wreake
 Gaddesby, Garthorpe, Grimston, Saxelbye, Shoby
 Goadby Marwood
 Harby
 Hoby with Rotherby
 Kirby Bellars, Knossington and Cold Overton
 Scalford, Somerby, Sproxton, Stathern
 Twyford and Thorpe
 Waltham and Thorpe Arnold, Wymondham

Political representation

There are 28 Councillors, of which 22 are Conservative and so control the Council. The Conservative Leader of the Council is Cllr Joe Orson, who represents the Old Dalby Ward.

The Melton and Rutland constituency is Conservative.

East Midlands Councils is based opposite the former Melton borough offices on the A606 within the PERA complex.

Geography

The district borders South Kesteven, in Lincolnshire, to the east, Rutland to the south, Charnwood to the west (along the A46 Fosse Way), and Rushcliffe and Newark and Sherwood in Nottinghamshire to the north. The north part of the district is known as the Vale of Belvoir.

Economy
Farming and food production are the main industries with Pedigree Petfoods in Melton, and its Waltham Centre for Pet Nutrition at Waltham on the Wolds. There is a large creamery (Long Clawson Dairy) at Long Clawson. Samworth Brothers are headquartered in Melton. The Royal Army Veterinary Corps and Defence Animal Training Regiment are also in Melton.

The Birmingham to Peterborough Line runs through the borough, and the borough is criss-crossed by the A607 (Leicester-Grantham) and the A606 (Nottingham-Oakham). Both these roads meet in the centre of Melton (outside Melton Brooksby College), with resulting congestion.

Education

Until September 2008, the district operated the three-tier education system, whereby there were three middle schools. All these schools fed into the same upper school in Melton from 14-18. At both GCSE and A level, the district's results are above the England average. From age 16 Students can attend either Melton Vale Post 16 Centre for academic sixth form courses, or Brooksby Melton College for vocational courses.

Demographics
The Borough of Melton has experienced steady population growth in recent times albeit at a rate lower than the other districts within Leicestershire.

Highest rate of accidental death in England in 2010/11
In March 2012, Melton was identified as having the highest rate of accidental death by The Royal Society for the Prevention of Accidents, with statistics over the period from 2010/11 showing an average of 29 deaths for 100,000 people.

Arms

References

External links

 Community profile at Leicestershire County Council
 Council returns to Melton in October 2008
 Council office demolished in June 2008
Stapleford Miniature Railway

 
Non-metropolitan districts of Leicestershire
Boroughs in England